Belgium was represented by Dutch singer Stella Maessen (billed simply as Stella), with the song "Si tu aimes ma musique", at the 1982 Eurovision Song Contest, which took place in Harrogate, England on 24 April. 

This was Stella's third appearance at Eurovision: She had appeared twice as part of the group Hearts of Soul/Dream Express for the Netherlands in 1970 and for Belgium in 1977. As a solo singer, she had also taken part in the Belgian preselection in 1981.

Before Eurovision

Eurosong 
Eurosong consisted of three heats, a semi-final, and the final on 21 February 1982. All the shows took place at the RTBF studios in Brussels, hosted by Pierre Collard-Bovy.

Heats
The first heat took place on 24 January 1982 and six of the competing acts performed. The top two entries decided by televoting advanced to the semi-final. 

The second heat took place on 31 January 1982 and six of the competing acts performed. The top two entries decided by televoting advanced to the semi-final.

The third heat took place on 7 February 1982 and six of the competing acts performed. The top two entries decided by televoting advanced to the semi-final.

Semi-final
The semi-final took place on 14 February 1982 and six of the competing acts performed. The top four entries decided by televoting advanced to the final.

Final 
The final was held on 21 February 1982 with the winning song chosen by a 12-member jury panel. After Stella's win, it was reported that some RTBF executives were unhappy about the fact that they were to be represented by a Dutch-born singer who spoke very little French.

At Eurovision 
On the night of the final Stella performed 11th in the running order, following Austria and preceding Spain. At the close of the voting "Si tu aimes ma musique" had received 96 points, placing Belgium 4th of the 18 entries. Although the song did not receive any 12 points votes (the highest were 10 from Denmark and Spain), it achieved the distinction of being only the eighth song in Eurovision history to that date (and only the third non-winner) to receive points from every other participating country (excluding the 1971-1973 contests where each country had to award a minimum of 2 points to every song). The Belgian jury awarded its 12 points to Switzerland.

Voting

References

External links 
 Belgian Preselection 1982

1982
Countries in the Eurovision Song Contest 1982
Eurovision